The hainan blue flycatcher (Cyornis hainanus) is a bird in the family Muscicapidae. The species was first described by William Robert Ogilvie-Grant in 1900. It is found in Cambodia, China, Hong Kong, Laos, Myanmar, Thailand, and Vietnam.
Its natural habitat is subtropical or tropical moist lowland forests.

Gallery

References

External links

Hainan blue flycatcher
Birds of South China
Birds of Hainan
Birds of Southeast Asia
Taxa named by William Robert Ogilvie-Grant
Hainan blue flycatcher
Taxonomy articles created by Polbot